Abalos Mensa is a wedge-shaped mound, or mensa and one of the named features in the vicinity of Planum Boreum, the Martian North pole. It is named after one of the classical albedo features on Mars. Its name was officially approved by IAU in 2006. It extends from latitude 80.21°N to 82.4°N and from longitude 279.34°E to 290.52°E (69.48°W – 80.66°W). Its centre is located at latitude 81.17°N, longitude 284.4°E (75.6°W), and has a diameter of 129.18 km.

Abalos Mensa is a convex formation of approximately 180 kilometer span, with a top-view shaped like a wedge, and lies immediately to the south of the Rupes Tenuis scarp, approximately at 285ºE. In the neighbourhood of Abalos Mensa is the beginning of the dune field of Abalos Undae which continues in a southwestward direction after it emerges from the western end of a narrow channel separating Rupes Tenuis from Abalos Mensa. 
Crotone crater, located at 82.2ºN, 290.0ºE with a 6.4 km diameter, is situated at the channel separating the Rupes Tenuis scarp from Abalos Mensa. West of Abalos Mensa, parallel to and south of the Rupes Tenuis scarp, runs a narrow, low-altitude plain, named Tenuis Mensa, which exhibits a southward slope. The southern part of Abalos Mensa ends in a scarp called Abalos Scopuli.

Formation theories

Research on the stratigraphic analysis of the Martian circumpolar deposits is ongoing because it provides information on the ancient climate and geological formation processes of the planet. The circumpolar deposit of Abalos Mensa has been described as an "enigmatic wedge of material", which has been studied by scientists due to its uncommon location and shape characteristics. Formation theories for Abalos Mensa primarily propose erosional processes based either on fluid action or wind action; the latter are known as Aeolian processes, named after Aeolus, the ancient Greek God of the wind.

The fluid flow theories propose fluid action which would erode the surrounding area and produce the channels that separate Abalos Mensa from the main ice cap. The fluid flow theories require volcanic action which would provide the thermal energy to melt the polar materials which would then flow and cause erosion of the area. There have been a number of questions raised about the fluid flow theories, including the uncertainty of volcanic activity in the Planum Boreum region.

Impact-shielding-based Aeolian theories propose that ancient material from the base of Planum Boreum was protected by ejecta from an impact crater, and when the old base material of the surrounding area disappeared, the protected mound acted like a source for further accumulation of new deposits, which, with time, produced the mound of Abalos Mensa.

A modified, numerical, Aeolian-based approach uses the data provided by the SHARAD, HiRISE, and MOLA instruments on board the Mars Reconnaissance Orbiter, to produce a topographic simulation of the area of Abalos Mensa, which is then combined with weather modeling to produce a simulation of the weather conditions and morphological evolution of the area. This approach has determined that the form of Abalos Mensa can be derived using the computer simulation without the need for assumptions such as polar volcanic activity, or impact-shielding of the old polar basal unit.

Images by NASA and ESA

See also 
 Hagal dune field 
 Nili Patera dune field

References 

Mensae on Mars
Mare Boreum quadrangle